was a Japanese politician and first chairman of the Japanese Communist Party from 1945 until his death in 1953.

Biography
Kyuichi Tokuda was born in 1894 in Okinawa and became a lawyer following graduation from Nihon University in 1920. He joined the Japanese Communist Party in 1922 and became a member of its Central Committee.

In 1922 Tokuda participated in the formation of the outlawed Japanese Communist Party. He would go on to visit the Soviet Union in both 1925 and 1927; and ran for the Labour-Farmer Party in the first regular election in 1928 (Fukuoka's 3rd district) but ended up being unsuccessful. In March 1928 he was arrested under the suspicion of violating the Peace Preservation Law, and would go on to spend 18 years in prison. From 1934 to 1940, he was imprisoned at Abashiri Prison. Tokuda was discovered and released from prison on October 10, 1945 by French Journalist Robert Guillain who at the time had visited the Fuchu Prison. While in prison, he occupied a cell adjacent to fellow Communist leader Yoshio Shiga. Upon his release, he was reportedly hoisted to the shoulders of a crowd of Communists and Koreans chanting anti-imperial messages.

After World War II, he was elected to the House of Representatives in the general election of 1946 along with his cousin, Senzo Nosaka, who had returned from the Republic of China. In the same year he married his cousin Kosaku's widow, Tatsu Tokuda (formerly known as Kanehara). Tokuda was involved in the 1947 general strike and in 1948, he survived an assassination attempt by a dynamite-laden soda bottle thrown at his feet while he was giving a speech. By 1950, he was considered the second-in-command of the JCP and a key supporter of party leader Sanzo Nosaka; in the same year his party split internally following criticism by the Comiform. Along with other JCP leaders, he was purged from public office and politics under the Allied occupation. In October of the same year he defected to the PRC from the port of Osaka and organized the Peking Organization. Tokuda would continue to make decisions on the party's general policy from his exile. During his last years in China, he led a "mainstream" faction of the JCP and organized violent operations in Japan through the underground "Free Japan Radio". He died in Beijing and his death was not made public until 1955. A memorial service for Tokuda was held in Beijing on September 13 of the same year, which was attended by 30,000 people. 

In the opening session of the 20th Party Congress of the Communist Party of the Soviet Union, on  14 February 1956, Nikita Khrushchev asked delegates to rise in honour of the Communist leaders who had died since the last congress - and named Kyuichi Tokuda, whose name was nearly unknown in the Soviet Union, on equal terms with the recently deceased Joseph Stalin. That was a clear and deliberate insult to Stalin, and it served as a preliminary to Khrushchev's speech later in the same conference in which he strongly denounced Stalin's "Cult of Personality".

Works
Eighteen Years in Prison (Gokuchu juhachi-nen) by Kyuichi Tokuda and Yoshio Shiga. Published by the Japanese Communist Party in 1948.
Appeal to the People

See also 
 Japanese dissidence during the Shōwa period
 Mountain Village Operation Unit

References

External links 

 
 

Members of the House of Representatives from Tokyo
Japanese Communist Party politicians
Japanese communists
Stalinism
Anti-revisionists
Japanese revolutionaries
20th-century Japanese lawyers
Nihon University alumni
People from Okinawa Prefecture
1894 births
1953 deaths
Members of the House of Representatives (Empire of Japan)